Julie Marques Abreu (born 6 August 2004) is a Luxembourger footballer who plays as a forward for Belgian Women's Super League club Standard Liège and the Luxembourg women's national team.

International career
Marques Abreu made her senior debut for Luxembourg on 21 June 2019 during a 2–1 friendly win against Andorra.

International goals

References

2004 births
Living people
Women's association football forwards
Luxembourgian women's footballers
Luxembourg women's international footballers
Luxembourgian people of Portuguese descent
Standard Liège (women) players